This is a list of players, past and present, who have been capped by their country in international football whilst playing for Celtic Football Club. As well as Scotland, 38 other nations have fielded Celtic players in their international sides.

Albania

Rudi Vata

Australia

Aaron Mooy
Daniel Arzani (1)
Scott McDonald
Tom Rogic
Mark Viduka

Belgium

Dedryck Boyata
Jason Denayer
Joos Valgaeren

Bulgaria

Stiliyan Petrov
Aleksandar Tonev

Cameroon

Landry N'Guémo

Canada

Alistair Johnston1
Joe Kennaway1

China

Du Wei
Zheng Zhi

Croatia

Josip Juranović

Costa Rica

 Cristian Gamboa

Czech Republic

Jiří Jarošík

Denmark

Oliver Abildgaard
Thomas Gravesen
Ulrik Laursen
Morten Rasmussen
Marc Rieper
Erik Sviatchenko
Morten Wieghorst
Matt O’Reily

England

Fraser Forster

Alan Thompson
Joe Hart
Chris Sutton

Finland

Teemu Pukki

Germany

Andreas Hinkel
Andreas Thom

Ghana

Mubarak Wakaso

Greece

Vasilis Barkas
Georgios Samaras
Giorgos Giakoumakis

Guinea

Bobo Balde
Mohammed Sylla

Honduras

Emilio Izaguirre

Iceland

Teddy Bjarnason
Jóhannes Eðvaldsson

Ireland

 From 1882–1921 Ireland were an "All Ireland" side. On the partitioning of Ireland in 1920 they continued to play as Ireland (IFA) alongside the newly formed Dublin-based Irish Free State side. Up until 1953 both sides claimed to represent all of Ireland, at which point FIFA ruled that neither side could call themselves "Ireland"; instead, the IFA side were named "Northern Ireland" whilst the FAI side were named "Republic of Ireland". Several players were capped by both international sides following partition, until 1950 when FIFA intervened and ruled that players could no longer do this.
Frank Collins2
Billy Cook
Patsy Gallacher2
Peter Kavanagh2
Charlie Tully Also later played for Northern Ireland

Israel

Eyal Berkovic
Nir Biton
Rami Gershon
Beram Kayal
Hatem Abd Elhamed
Liel Abada

Ivory Coast

Olivier Tebily
Ismalia  Soro

Japan

Shunsuke Nakamura
Kyogo Furuhashi
Daizen Maeda
Yosuke Ideughi
Reo Hatate
Koki Mizuno
Yoki Kobayashi
Tomoki Iwata

Kenya

Victor Wanyama

Montenegro

Sead Hakšabanović

Mexico

Efraín Juárez

Netherlands

Edson Braafheid
Glenn Loovens
Pierre van Hooijdonk
Jan Vennegoor of Hesselink

New Zealand

Chris Killen

Nigeria

Efe Ambrose

Northern Ireland

Conor Hazard
Neil Lennon
Paddy McCourt
Niall McGinn
Allen McKnight
Bertie Peacock
Anton Rogan
Charlie Tully

Norway

Kristoffer Ajer
Harald Brattbakk
Vidar Riseth
Thomas Rogne
Stefan Johansen

Poland

Artur Boruc
Paweł Brożek
Dariusz Dziekanowski
Dariusz Wdowczyk
Maciej Zurawski
Łukasz Załuska

Portugal

Jorge Cadete
Jota

Republic of Ireland / Ireland (FAI)

 On the partitioning of Ireland in 1922, the Dublin-based FAI were formed and fielded a separate international side from the already established Belfast run (IFA) Ireland international side.  Up until 1953 both sides claimed to represent all of Ireland, at which point FIFA ruled that neither side could call themselves "Ireland"; instead, the FAI side were named "Republic of Ireland" whilst the IFA side were named "Northern Ireland".  Several players had been capped by both international sides following partition, until 1950 when FIFA intervened and ruled that players could no longer do this.
Pat Bonner
Tony Cascarino
Tommy Coyne
Shane Duffy
Sean Fallon
Patsy Gallacher
Charlie Gallagher
Joe Haverty
Colin Healy
Peter Kavanagh2
Mick McCarthy
Roy Keane 
Aiden McGeady
Liam Miller
Chris Morris
Lee O'Connor
Robbie Keane
Anthony Stokes
Paddy Turner

Russia

Dmitri Kharine

Scotland

Appearances correct as of 16 November 2021

Roy Aitken (50)

Stuart Armstrong (6)
Bertie Auld (3)
Scott Bain (3)
Barney Battles, Sr. (3)
Craig Beattie (5)
Jack Bell (5)
Alec Bennett (3)
James Blessington (4)

Tom Boyd (66)
Jim Brogan (4)
Scott Brown (52)
John Browning (1)
Mark Burchill (6)
Tommy Burns (8)
Craig Burley (16)
Gary Caldwell (17)
John Campbell (12)
Joe Cassidy (4)
Stevie Chalmers (5)
Ryan Christie (8)
John Clark (4)
Bobby Collins (22)
John Collins (32)
Kris Commons (5)

George Connelly (2)
Jim Craig (1)
Joe Craig (1)

Stephen Crainey (4)
Pat Crerand (11)
William Cringan (5)
Johnny Crum (2)
Kenny Dalglish (47)
John "Dixie" Deans (2)
Jimmy Delaney (9)
John Divers Sr. (1)
John Divers Jr. (1)
Joe Dodds (3)
Simon Donnelly (10)
Peter Dowds (1)
Dan Doyle (8)

Rab Douglas (18)
Bobby Evans (45)
Willie Fernie (12)
James Forrest (38)
Danny Fox (1)
Mike Galloway (1)
Tommy Gemmell (18)

John Gilchrist (1)
Ronnie Glavin (1)
Craig Gordon  (14)
Jonathan Gould (2)
Peter Grant (2)
Leigh Griffiths (18)
Willie Groves (2)
Frank Haffey (2)
Paul Hartley (11)
Mike Haughney (1)
David Hay (27)
Jimmy Hay (8)
Jack Hendry (3)
Bobby Hogg (1)
John Hughes (8)
Ally Hunter (2)
Darren Jackson (8)

Mo Johnston (10)
Jimmy Johnstone (23)
James Kelly (7)
Joe Kennaway1 (1)
Jim Kennedy (6)
John Kennedy (1)
Alexander King (4)
Paul Lambert (31)
Bobby Lennox (10)
Willie Loney (2)
Duncan MacKay (14)
Murdo MacLeod (5)
Lou Macari (6)
Jake Madden (2)
Willie Maley (2)
Shaun Maloney (10)
David Marshall (2)
Gordon Marshall (1)
Henry Marshall (2)
Daniel McArthur (3)
Andrew McAtee (1)
Frank McAvennie (1)
Joe McBride (2)
Brian McClair (4)
Frank McGarvey (5)

Peter McGonagle (6)
Danny McGrain (62)
Callum McGregor (39)
Jimmy McGrory (7)
Tommy McInally (2)
Thomas McKeown (2)
Tosh McKinlay (22)
James McLaren (2)
Adam McLean (4)
Donald McLeod (4)
Sandy McMahon (6)
Stephen McManus (22)
Jimmy McMenemy (12)
Alec McNair (15)
Jackie McNamara (30)
Billy McNeill (29)
John McPhail (5)
Paul McStay (76)
Willie McStay (13)
Peter Meechan (1)
Kenny Miller (7)
Willie Miller (6)
Neil Mochan (3)
Lewis Morgan (1)
Charlie Mulgrew (22)
Bobby Murdoch (12)
Frank Murphy (1)
Charlie Napier (3)
Charlie Nicholas (6)

Brian O'Neil (1)
Willie Orr (1)
George Paterson (2)
Stephen Pearson (4)

Davie Provan (10)
Jimmy Quinn (11)
Anthony Ralston (1)
Barry Robson (7)
Davie Russell (4)
Peter Scarff (1)
Ronnie Simpson (5)
Eric Smith (2)
Jamie Smith (2)

Peter Somers (4)
David Storrier (3)
Greg Taylor (4)
Kieran Tierney (12)
Alec Thomson (3)
John Thomson (4)
Bertie Thomson (1)
Andy Walker (3)
Willie Wallace (4)
Derek Whyte (4)
Mark Wilson (1)
Paul Wilson (1)
Peter Wilson (4)
James Young (1)

Senegal

Diomansy Kamara
Henri Camara

Sierra Leone

Mohamed Bangura

Slovakia

Ľubomír Moravčík
Stanislav Varga

South Korea

Cha Du-ri
Ki Sung-Yueng

Sweden

John Guidetti 
Magnus Hedman
Henrik Larsson 
Mikael Lustig
Daniel Majstorović
Johan Mjällby
Carl Starfelt

Venezuela

Fernando de Ornelas
Miku

Wales

Craig Bellamy
John Hartson
Joe Ledley
Adam Matthews

Zimbabwe 

Kundai Benyu

Notes
1 Joe Kennaway had dual nationality
2 Between 1921 and 1950 several players were capped by both the Irish Free State (Dublin based FAI) and Ireland (Belfast based IFA) as both teams claimed they represented the whole of Ireland. In 1950, FIFA intervened and ruled that players were no longer allowed to play for both sides. From 1953, under further instruction from FIFA, the Dublin-run FAI team became known as Republic of Ireland whilst the Belfast-run IFA team became known as Northern Ireland.

References

Celtic players who have played for England, englandstats.com

Celtic F.C. players
Celtic F.C. international
Association football player non-biographical articles
Internationals
International
Celtic